McCree is a Scottish surname. Notable people with the surname include:

Arleigh McCree (1939–1986), American bomb disposal expert
Floyd J. McCree (1923–1988), American politician
Jimmy McCree (1902–1984), Scottish footballer
J. Mallory McCree, American actor
Kathleen McCree Lewis (1947–2007), American lawyer
Logan McCree (born 1977), German pornographic actor
Marlon McCree (born 1977), American footballer
Nathan McCree (born 1969), English music composer
Wade H. McCree (1920–1987), American lawyer and judge

Fictional characters
Jesse McCree, the original name of Cole Cassidy, a character from the 2016 video game

See also
Mad Dog McCree, laserdisc video game